

Administrative and municipal divisions

References

Altai Krai
Altai Krai